Jeff Reed Judkins (born March 23, 1956) is a retired American professional basketball player and coach. He coached the Brigham Young University (BYU) Cougars women's basketball team from 2001 to 2022, after serving as their assistant coach in 2000–01. A 6'6", 185-lb shooting guard, he played college basketball at the University of Utah from 1974 to 1978 and had a career in the NBA from 1978 to 1983.

Early life and education
Born in Salt Lake City, Judkins attended Highland High School, where his jersey no. 34 was retired in February 2006. He was all-state in football, baseball as well as basketball. After high school, he played with the University of Utah under Utes head coach Jerry Pimm.

Professional playing career
Judkins was selected by the Boston Celtics with the 8th pick in the 2nd round of the 1978 NBA draft (he was Boston's second pick in that draft after Hall-of-Famer Larry Bird.) As well as playing for the Celtics, Judkins spent time with the Utah Jazz, Detroit Pistons and Portland Trail Blazers. He holds career averages of 5.4 points, 1.6 rebounds and 1.0 assist per game.

Coaching career
After retiring from professional basketball, Judkins became an executive with Safelite.

As well as previously serving at BYU as a women's assistant coach to his predecessor Trent Shippen, and as the director of basketball operations, Judkins has also served as a men's assistant coach under Rick Majerus at the University of Utah.

Personal life
A member of the Church of Jesus Christ of Latter-day Saints, Judkins is married and has five children and 13 grandchildren. Judkins' brother, Jon, is currently the head coach of Division I Utah Tech in St. George, Utah He is a cousin of Danny Vranes, his teammate at Utah.

Head coaching record

References

External links
BYU Cougars bio
NBA stats @ basketballreference.com

1956 births
Living people
American men's basketball coaches
American men's basketball players
American women's basketball coaches
Basketball coaches from Utah
Basketball players from Salt Lake City
Boston Celtics draft picks
Boston Celtics players
BYU Cougars women's basketball coaches
Dallas Mavericks expansion draft picks
Detroit Pistons players
Latter Day Saints from Utah
Portland Trail Blazers players
Shooting guards
Small forwards
Sportspeople from Salt Lake City
Utah Jazz players
Utah Utes men's basketball coaches
Utah Utes men's basketball players